Halima Ahmed is a Somali political activist.

Personal life
Ahmed was born in Somalia. For her post-secondary education, she earned a Bachelor of Arts degree in International Relations from the Geneva School of Diplomacy in Geneva, Switzerland.

Career
Ahmed began her career with the Youth Rehabilitation Center in Mogadishu, Somalia's capital. Her duties there included taking care of insurgents that had defected to join the Somali government.

She later became a prospective candidate in the new Federal Parliament of Somalia, which was inaugurated in August 2012.

See also
Hodan Ahmed

Notes

External links
World Economic Forum: Global Shapers Community - Halima Ahmed

Ethnic Somali people
Geneva School of Diplomacy and International Relations alumni
Living people
Somalian activists
Somalian women activists
Somalian Muslims
Somalian expatriates in Switzerland
Year of birth missing (living people)